Shane Ryan is an Irish Gaelic footballer who plays for the Rathmore club and at senior level for the Kerry county team. His inter-county position is goalkeeper but he plays outfield for his club.
Kerry keeper Ryan the key man in Rathmore title triumph

Honours
Rathmore
Kerry Intermediate Football Championship: (1) 2022
Munster Intermediate Club Football Championship: (1) 2022
All-Ireland Intermediate Club Football Championship: (1) 2023
East Kerry Senior Football Championship: (4) 2014, 2015, 2016, 2017

East Kerry
Kerry Senior Football Championship: (2) 2020, 2022 

Kerry
All-Ireland Senior Football Championship (1): 2022
 National Football League (3): 2020,2021, 2022
 McGrath Cup: 2022
Munster Senior Football Championship (3): 2019, 2021, 2022
Munster Under-21 Football Championship (1): 2017
Munster Minor Football Championship (2): 2013, 2014
All-Ireland Minor Football Championship (1): 2014
Individual
All Star (1): 2022

References

Year of birth missing (living people)
Living people
All Stars Awards winners (football)
Gaelic football goalkeepers
Kerry inter-county Gaelic footballers
Rathmore Gaelic footballers